Phlegmariurus crassus is a lycophyte found in Central and South America.

Distribution
It is found from Hispaniola and Mexico south through South America to Paraguay.

References

crassus
Taxa named by Aimé Bonpland
Taxa named by Alexander von Humboldt